Enza is a river in northern Italy.

Enza may also refer to:

 Enza (given name), a list of people with the name
 Enza Station, a railway station in Takamatsu, Kagawa, Japan
 Daedalus (yacht), a maxi-catamaran named ENZA New Zealand in 1993 and 1994

See also
 Enza Zaden, a Dutch vegetable breeding company
 ENSA (disambiguation)